The Chinese Taipei national Baseball5 team represents the Republic of China (Taiwan) in international Baseball5 competitions. They are the current Asian champions.

History
Chinese Taipei participated in the inaugural Baseball5 Asia Cup in Kuala Lumpur, where the team won the tournament after defeating Japan 2 matches to 1.

The team qualified for the 2022 Baseball5 World Cup held in Mexico City as Asian champions. Chinese Taipei won the bronze medal defeating Venezuela 2 matches to 0 and finished with a 6–3 record.

Current roster

Staff

Tournament record

Baseball5 World Cup

Baseball5 Asia Cup

References

National baseball5 teams in Asia
Baseball5